The Volkswagen Group MSB platform (Modularer Standardantriebsbaukasten, modular standard drivetrain matrix) is the company's strategy for shared modular design construction of its longitudinal, front-engine, rear-wheel-drive layout (optional front-engine, four-wheel-drive layout) automobiles. It was developed by Porsche for vehicles with longitudinally mounted engines and gearboxes and four-wheel or rear-wheel drive. It has been in use since 2016 and was introduced with the second generation Porsche Panamera.

MSB-based models
The MSB architecture replaces the D1 platform and that used on the first generation 970 Porsche Panamera (G1).

Models 
Porsche Panamera (G2) (971, 2017–present)
Bentley Continental GT third generation (Typ 3S, 2018–present)
Bentley Flying Spur third generation (Typ 3S, 2019–present)

J1 Platform Models 
 Porsche Taycan (J1 Performance; 2019–present)
 Audi e-tron GT (J1 Performance; 2020–present)

See also
 Volkswagen Group MQB platform
 Volkswagen Group MLB platform
 Volkswagen Group MEB platform
 Volkswagen Group New Small Family platform
 List of Volkswagen Group platforms

References

External links
Volkswagen Group corporate website

Volkswagen Group platforms
Porsche